Crocus michelsonii  is a species of flowering plant in the genus Crocus of the family Iridaceae. It is a cormous perennial with a native range from northeastern Iran to southern Turkmenistan.

References

michelsonii